The Man I Love may refer to:

"The Man I Love" (song), a popular song by George Gershwin, from the musical Lady Be Good
The Man I Love (album), a 1957 album by Peggy Lee
The Man I Love (1929 film), directed by William A. Wellman
The Man I Love (1947 film)
The Man I Love (1997 film)
The Man I Love (ballet), a 2009 ballet made by Susan Stroman on New York City Ballet

See also
The Men I Love, a tribute album by Amii Stewart released in 1995